Elizabeth Janeway (née Hall) (October 7, 1913 – January 15, 2005) was an American author and critic.

Biography
Born Elizabeth Ames Hall in Brooklyn, New York, her naval architect father and homemaker mother fell on hard times during the Depression, leading her to end her Swarthmore College education and help support the family by creating bargain-basement sale slogans (she graduated from Barnard College just a few years later, in 1935).

Intent on becoming an author, Janeway took the same creative writing class again and again to help hone her craft. While working on her first novel, The Walsh Girls, she met and married Eliot Janeway, a much-quoted economist, who was to enjoy some influence with Presidents Franklin Delano Roosevelt and Lyndon B. Johnson (he was known as "Calamity Janeway" for his pessimistic economic forecasts). Elizabeth described Eliot as "the most intelligent man I had ever met."

The Janeways mingled with United States Supreme Court justices and many other public figures of the day (she recommended Erica Jong's Fear of Flying to Justice William O. Douglas).

At the behest of labor organizer Walter Reuther, she aided General Motors workers with their mid-1940s strike against the company.

Janeway finally finished Girls in 1943 while awaiting the birth of her second child; she signed the contract with the publishers while en route to the hospital. A later novel, 1949's The Question of Gregory, attracted attention due to the eerie similarities between Gregory and James Forrestal, a defense secretary and acquaintance of the Janeways who committed suicide. Janeway denied any connection between fact and fiction; she said the real theme of the book was "liberals in trouble".

All in all, Janeway wrote seven novels; one, 1945's Daisy Kenyon, was made into a film starring Joan Crawford. For a time, Janeway was a reviewer for The New York Times. In that capacity, she introduced writer Anthony Powell and served as a champion of controversial works such as Lolita. She was also a reviewer for Ms..

From 1965–1969, she served as president of the Authors Guild, addressing lawmakers about copyright protection and other matters.

Many of Janeway's early works focused on the family situation, with occasional glimpses at the struggles of women in modern society. In the early 1970s, she began a more explicitly feminist path with works such as Man's World, Woman's Place: A Study of Social Mythology. She befriended Betty Friedan, Gloria Steinem, and Kate Millett, and was strongly in favor of abortion rights. Janeway continued to write and go on lecture tours. She learned to speak Russian so she could visit the Soviet Union.

Janeway was a judge for the National Book Awards in 1955 and for the Pulitzer Prize in 1971. She was an executive of International PEN. At its 1981 commencement ceremonies, her alma mater Barnard College awarded Janeway its highest honor, the Barnard Medal of Distinction.

Elizabeth Hall Janeway died in 2005 at her Rye, New York home. She was survived by two sons: Columbia Graduate School of Journalism professor, The Boston Globe editor, and former Atlantic Monthly executive Michael Janeway and William H. Janeway, until 2006 a vice chairman at Warburg Pincus, as well as by three grandchildren and a great-granddaughter.

The Star Trek: Voyager character Kathryn Janeway  originally shared her name, but writers changed the name after learning of her.

References

External links
 Obituary at The Guardian
 More Janeway quotes at thinkexist.com

1913 births
2005 deaths
20th-century American novelists
Barnard College alumni
Writers from Brooklyn
People from Rye, New York
Swarthmore College alumni
American women novelists
20th-century American women writers
Novelists from New York (state)
American women non-fiction writers
20th-century American non-fiction writers
21st-century American women